Bereni is a commune in Mureș County, Transylvania, Romania. It became an independent commune along with 6 other villages when it split from Măgherani (Nyárádmagyarós) in 2004. It has an absolute Hungarian majority.
The commune is composed of seven villages:
Bâra / Berekeresztúr
Bereni / Székelybere
Cându / Kendő
Drojdii / Seprőd
Eremieni / Nyárádszentimre
Maia / Mája
Mărculeni / Márkod

Demographics

The commune has a total population of 1,189 of which 1,164 or 97.9% are Hungarians.

See also 
 List of Hungarian exonyms (Mureș County)

References

Communes in Mureș County
Localities in Transylvania
Székely communities